Herbert Spencer Zim (July 12, 1909 – December 5, 1994) was a naturalist, author, editor and educator best known as the founder (1945) and editor-in-chief of the Golden Guides series of nature books.

Biography
Zim was born 1909 in New York City, but spent his childhood years in southern California. At the age of fourteen he returned to the east. He took his degrees (B.S. biologia, M.S. biologia, Ph.D. botanica) at Columbia University.

Zim wrote or edited more than one hundred books on science, and in a thirty-year career teaching in the public schools introduced laboratory instruction into elementary school science. He is best known as the founder in 1945 (and, for twenty-five years, editor in chief) of the Golden Guides, pocket-size introductions for children to such subjects as fossils, zoology, microscopy, rocks and minerals, trees, wildflowers, dinosaurs, navigation and more. He was the sole or co-author for many of the books, which were valued for their clarity, accuracy and attractive presentation—helped by the illustrations of James Gordon Irving and Zim's friend Raymond Perlman.

He moved to Florida with his wife, the anthropologist Sonia (Sonnie) Bleeker, and continued to work on the Golden Guides series until Alzheimer's disease forced him to slow down in the 1990s. He died in 1994 at Plantation Key, survived by his second wife, Grace Showe, and two sons.

See also
The Legend of Wan Hu
Golden Field Guide

References

External links
The Herbert S. Zim papers at the de Grummond Children's Literature Collection, The University of Southern Mississippi
Guide to the Herbert Zim papers at the University of Oregon.

1909 births
1994 deaths
20th-century American educators
American science writers
American print editors
Columbia College (New York) alumni
Recreational cryptographers
20th-century American non-fiction writers
Columbia Graduate School of Arts and Sciences alumni